HLA-B18 (B18) is an HLA-B serotype. The serotype identifies the more common HLA-B*18 gene products. (For terminology help see: HLA-serotype tutorial) B*1801, the most common allele is at highest frequencies in Northern Italy and the Balkans, a peak frequency distribution it shares with B*3501.

Serotype
B*18:06 is one of the four B alleles that reacts with neither Bw4 nor Bw6. The others are B*46:01, B*55:03, and B*73:01.

Allele frequencies

References

1